Newcastle is a village in the south-western part of South Dublin county, Ireland. It is also a civil parish in the barony  of the same name. It was the location of the castle of the barony, which in historical and official documents is described as Newcastle-Lyons. The area is still primarily rural in nature. Newcastle village is within the administrative area of South Dublin County Council.

History

Evidence of ancient settlement in the Newcastle area include a number of ringfort, fulacht fiadh and tower house sites in the townlands of Newcastle Farm, Newcastle North, Newcastle South and Ballynakelly. A raised motte, dated to the 12th century Norman invasion of Ireland, is located close to the medieval church in Newcastle, St Finian's church.

The parliamentary borough of Newcastle elected two MPs to the Irish House of Commons from 1613 to 1801. It was disenfranchised by the Acts of Union 1800.

The gradual relaxation of the Penal Laws throughout Ireland and Great Britain from 1778 onward culminated in the Roman Catholic Relief Act 1793 passed the Irish Parliament. The eventual achievement of full Catholic Relief was secured during the administration of the Dublin-born hero of the Napoleonic war, the Duke of Wellington. Signed into law by George IV, it proclaimed wide Catholic Emancipation in 1829. This followed a very effective Irish campaign by Daniel O'Connell, 'the Liberator'. In the ensuing general Christian religious revival, it became possible for the reinstated Roman Catholic Church community to build a new church here in the 1830s. The existing pre-reformation Irish Church premises had continued in use as a place of worship by the established Church of Ireland following the schism caused by the divorce of the newly created King of Ireland, Henry VIII. The subsequent church Reformation in the 1550s under Edward and later under Elizabeth I during the Tudor reconquest and plantation of Ireland was only moderately successful. It did not succeed with the majority of the native Irish or Hiberno-Irish leaders or, as a consequence, with their few priests or their generally illiterate followers. The former residential tower fortification of the castle now forms part of St Finian's Church of Ireland church. It was built originally in the late 14th century. The eastern stained glass window of the church serves as an unofficial symbol of Newcastle village, and features on the crest of Saint Finian's National School.

Location and population
Newcastle-Lyons is located at the junction of the R120 and the R405 regional roads. It lies approximately 3 km north of the N7 at Rathcoole, 6 km south-east of Celbridge, and 9 km west of Tallaght. The village lies west of Casement Aerodrome (Baldonnell), the HQ of the Irish Air Corps. It features a public house and two churches. Peamount Hospital, a facility for long-term care, is 2 km north of the town centre on the R120. The 2001 census registered a village population of 1,160, but the surrounding area has grown rapidly since then, with the village population doubling by 2010.

Transport
Newcastle-Lyons is served by the number 68 bus to the city centre. It is also connected to the rail network via the nearby train station of Hazelhatch and Celbridge.

Sport
Newcastle-Lyons is home to St Finian's Newcastle GAA club which was founded in 1943. In 1949, the club won the Dublin Intermediate Championship.

The association football (soccer) club, Peamount United F.C., is also based in the area. Founded in 1983, the club is based in a purpose-built facility in Greenogue, Newcastle. In the 2011–12 season Peamount United's ladies team became the first Irish club to qualify for the UEFA Women's Champions League. Peamount United's male adult team plays in the Senior 1 division of the Leinster Senior League. The ladies' team plays in the Women's National League.

Elm Hall Golf Club in located near Newcastle at Hazelhatch. It features two 18-hole pitch and putt courses.

See also
 List of subdivisions of County Dublin
 List of towns and villages in the Republic of Ireland

References

Towns and villages in South Dublin (county)
Civil parishes of Newcastle, County Dublin